Shin Youngsook (申榮淑, born November 26, 1975) is a South Korean musical theatre actress. She majored in vocal performance at the university. For her musical debut she appeared in the musical The Last Empress as Lady Sontag. She was a member of Seoul Performing Arts Company from 2000 to 2007. The final level of education she has completed is a master's degree in Dankook University.

Early life 
Shin was born in Seoul, South Korea, as the fifth youngest child. She began singing as a child, and played instruments such as piano, acoustic guitar, accordion, and harmonica. She became interested in Pansori. She won first place in a school choir competition several times. When she was in high school, she conducted the school choirs, and worked at the missionary choir. Thanks to her early musical activities, she started to learn voice performance at university.

Career 
After university graduation, Shin prepared to study her major abroad and auditioned for The Last Empress by chance. She was cast as Lady Sontag. She then decided to become a musical actress. After her debut, she entered Seoul Performing Arts Company in order to learn acting performance.

2000-2007 (Seoul Performing Arts Company) 

In 2002, Shin appeared as Nanny in musical Romeo and Juliet. She was nominated for the 7th Korean Musical Awards as best supporting actress. In 2004, she appeared as Kappuni in musical play The day to marry. She performed the character as an independent modern woman saying "I'll find my true love by myself." In 2005, she appeared as the title role Bari in the musical play Bari. Shin originated the role of Seryu in the musical The kingdom of the winds, and the role of Noksu in the musical Yi.

2008-present 

Shin appeared as the major characters of musicals such as Grizabella in Cats', Baroness Waldstatten in Mozart!, Gertrude in Hamlet, Madame Therese Defarge in A Tale of Two Cities, Mrs. Danvers in Rebecca, Empress Myeongseong in The Last Empress and Donna in Mamma Mia!. When she sang the musical number 'Gold von den Sternen (Gold star)' in Mozart! astonishingly well, she gained a nickname 'Ms. Gold star'. She was beloved for the role of Mrs. Danvers and Baroness Valdstatten, earning Golden Ticket Awards and Korea Musical Awards as the best supporting actress for these roles. In 2015, Shin came back as title role to her debut musical The Last Empress.

Stage performances 
 1999 The Last Empress, Lady Sontag
 2000 Daebak, Mrs. Heungbu
 2000 Taepung, Ariel
 2001 Taepung, Ariel
 2002 The kingdom of winds 
 2002 The morning of Goryeo, Princess Hyemyeong
 2002 Romeo and Juliet,  Nanny
 2002 Taepung, Trinculo
 2003 Romeo and Juliet, Nanny
 2003 Sound of Music, Reverend Mother
 2003 Christmas Carol, Madmame Cratchit
 2004 Midsummer night's dream,  Helena
 2004 The day to marry,  kappuni
 2004 Christmas Carol, Madame Cratchit
 2005 Bari, Bari
 2005 Christmas Carol, Madame Cratchit
 2005 Scents of Ancient, Moocheon, Sanhwaga
 2005 Romeo and Juliet, Nanny
 2006 Romeo and Juliet, Nanny
 2006 The Kingdom of winds, Seryu
 2006 Yi, Noksu
 2006 Christmas Carol, Madame Cratchit
 2007 Sister Soul,  Josephine
 2007 Hairspray,  motormouth
 2007 The kingdom of winds, Seryu
 2008 Cats, Grizabella
 2008 Bad boys,  Muriel
 2009 Romeo and Juliet (French production), Lady Capulet
 2009 Cats, Grizabella
 2010 Spamalot, Lady of the lake
 2010 Coronation Ball - starmania, Stella Spotlight / Cydia
 2010 Turandot,  Turandot
 2010 Mozart!, Baroness Valdstatten
 2011 Hamlet,  Gertrude
 2011 Mozart!, Baroness Valdstatten 
 2012 Rudolf,  Countess Larisch
 2012 A Tale of Two Cities,  Madame Defarge
 2012 Sherlock Holmes,  Jane Watson
 2013 Rebecca,  Mrs. Danvers
 2013 A Tale of Two Cities, Madame Defarge
 2013 Guys and Dolls, Adelaide
 2014 Mozart!, Baroness Valdstatten 
 2014 Rebecca, Mrs. Danvers.
 2015 Phantom, Madame Carlotta
 2015 The Last Empress, Myeongseong Empress
 2016 Rebecca, Mrs. Danvers
 2016 Mamma Mia!, Donna Sheridan
 2016 Mozart!, Baroness Valdstatten 
 2016 Phantom, Madame Carlotta
 2017 Turandot, Turandot
 2017 Rebecca, Mrs. Danvers
 2017 The last kiss, Marie Countess Larisch
 2018 The Man Who Laughs, Duchess Josiana
 2018 Elisabeth, Elisabeth
 2019 Xcalibur, Morgana
 2019 Mamma Mia!, Donna Sheridan
 2019 Rebecca, Mrs. Danvers
 2020 The Man Who Laughs, Duchess Josiana
 2020 Mozart!, Baroness Valdstatten
 2022 Mrs. Doubtfire, Miranda
 2022 Mrs. Doubtfire, Miranda
 2022–2023 42nd Street, Dorothy Brock

Awards 
 2018 2nd Korea Musical Awards, best supporting actress
 2017 1st Korea Musical Awards, best supporting actress
 2017 12th Golden Ticket Awards, best actress
 2016 10th DIMF Awards, the star of year
 2016 11th Golden Ticket Awards, Scene Stealer
 2015 9th DIMF Awards, the star of year
 2013 7th DIMF Awards, the star of year
 2012 18th Korean Musical Awards, best actress nomination
 2011 17th Korean Musical Awards, best actress nomination
 2010 4th The Musical Awards, best supporting actress
 2003 9th Korean Musical Awards, best supporting actress nomination

References

External links
 Fan page https://cafe.naver.com/shiningshin

Living people
1975 births
People from Seoul
South Korean musical theatre actresses
Dankook University alumni